Glitiškės is a village in Vilnius district, Lithuania. It is situated on the eastern bank of the Širvys Lake. According to the 2011 census, it had 549 residents. The village was the site of the massacre of several dozen Polish villagers by German collaborators in 1944.

References 

Villages in Vilnius County
Vilnius District Municipality
Vilensky Uyezd